Carragosa is a civil parish in the municipality of Bragança, Portugal. The population in 2011 was 190, in an area of 27.77 km².

References

Parishes of Bragança, Portugal